Störst av allt, or Quicksand, may refer to:

Störst av allt (album), by Carola Häggkvist
Störst av allt (novel), by Malin Persson Giolito
Störst av allt (TV series), based on the novel